Incahuasi (possibly from Quechua: inka Inca, wasi house) is a volcanic mountain in the Andes of South America. It lies on the border of the Catamarca Province of Argentina and the Atacama Region of Chile.
 
The volcano consists of a  caldera and two stratovolcanoes.

Geography and geology
Incahuasi lies on the border between Argentina and Chile, close to Paso San Francisco. A major road crosses the border there.

Regional
Incahuasi is part of the Central Volcanic Zone of the Andes, together with about 110 other Quaternary volcanoes, and lies in the southern sector of this zone; other volcanic zones in the Andes are the Northern Volcanic Zone, the Southern Volcanic Zone, and the Austral Volcanic Zone. The history of volcanic activity of most of these volcanoes is poorly understood owing to the lack of dating; only a few historical eruptions have been recorded, such as an eruption at Ojos del Salado in 1993.

Incahuasi is located northeast of Ojos del Salado, the highest volcano in the world. Both volcanoes are found at the southern end of the Central Volcanic Zone. Together with El Fraile, Cerro El Muerto, Nevado Tres Cruces, and El Solo, they form a  volcanic chain.

The area is dominated by volcanoes that were active after 1.5 million years ago. Also located close to Incahuasi are Falso Azufre and Nevado San Francisco, as well as the Miocene Cerro Morocho and Cerro Ojo de Las Lozas volcanoes. It has been suggested that a perpendicular chain of volcanoes including Ojos del Salado may be the consequence of the Juan Fernández Ridge subducting in the Peru–Chile Trench.

Between 9 and 6 million years ago, volcanic activity in the Maricunga Belt decreased and eventually ceased. Simultaneously, the back-arc experienced increased volcanic activity. Beginning 8.3 million years ago, there was a change in tectonic regime from an east-west compression to a north-south stretching, which led to a change in the alignments of the volcanoes.

Local
A  lava dome is located on the eastern flank.

Incahuasi has two craters, a summit crater and an arcuate crater on the eastern slope that contains a lava dome. Subsidiary vents conversely are associated with fissure vents. The edifice appears to consist of two overlapping volcanoes.

The western and southwestern slopes of Incahuasi are dotted with lava domes, which are more subdued than on other volcanoes in the region. They reach the Las Coladas salar east of Incahuasi. Two  coulees extend north and east of the main crater.

 northeast of Incahuasi, four pyroclastic cones can be found. They have covered  with lava but they are probably an independent volcanic system, similar to other regional mafic volcanoes. On Incahuasi's eastern flank lies a major lava dome and a field of lava flows.

Composition
Like many Andean volcanoes, Incahuasi has erupted andesite containing hornblende and pyroxene, but also trachyandesite and trachydacite. Lava flows on the main stratovolcano are dacitic.

The four cones northeast of the principal volcano have erupted basaltic andesite. Likewise, parasitic cones have erupted magnesium-rich basaltic andesite. Minerals contained in these rocks include clinopyroxene and olivine.

The occurrence of such basic magmas in a volcanic setting dominated by dacites appears to be a consequence of local tectonics, which involve the extension of the crust compared to the compressional regime farther west. Originating in the mantle, the magmas quickly ascended in faults and were contaminated by crustal material. The mantle itself had been modified before by crustal material added by delamination of the lower crust and subduction erosion.

Climate
Incahuasi does not have glaciers, but it does have at least temporary snowpack. Even the crater does not support the development of glaciers.

The volcano lies south of the so-called "Arid Diagonal", and most precipitation falls during winter. This aridity is caused by the rain shadow effect of the Subandean Ranges, which block moisture from the Atlantic Ocean.

Eruption history
One andesitic lava flow on the northwestern slope of Incahuasi has yielded two ages, one of 1.15 ± 0.5 million years ago and another of 710,000 ± 80,000 years ago. Based on their preservations, the lava flows appear to be of roughly comparable ages. Additional ages were obtained on the main edifice, 1.57 ± 0.1 million years ago, 1.14 ± 0.37 million years ago, and 1.00 ± 0.13 million years ago.

Parasitic cones were active over 500,000 years ago. These include the lava dome and lava flow fields (760,000 ± 90,000 and 740,000 ± 50,000 years ago, respectively) and a lava flow from the pyroclastic cones, which has been dated to 350,000 ± 30,000 years ago.

Volcanic activity at Incahuasi may have continued into the Holocene, considering the young appearance of its eruption products such as lava flows in the summit region and on the southern slopes; the old ages obtained by radiometric dating indicate an extinct volcano, although activity at Andean volcanoes is known to occur with long rest phases between eruptions (reaching one million years). There are reports of fumarolic activity. The volcano is considered a potential geological hazard to Argentina and Chile, where the SERNAGEOMIN hazard maps identify it as a potential threat. It was rated 27th out of 38 Argentine-Chilean volcanoes in dangerousness.

Climbing history
The mountain was first climbed by Inca people. In 1912, Walter Penck climbed the mountain. Legend has it that a railway engineer named Edward Flint ascended the mountain between 1854 and 1859.

Archaeology
In 1913, an Inca ceremonial structure was found on the summit of Incahuasi. Another archaeological site, "Fiambalá-1", lies at its foot. Other Inca archaeological sites in the region appear to have had functions correlated to that of the Incahuasi site.

See also
List of volcanoes in Chile
List of volcanoes in Argentina
List of Ultras of South America
Ojos del Salado
Nevado Tres Cruces
Cerro El Muerto

References

Sources

External links

Incahuasi 
"Cerro de Incahuasi, Argentina/Chile" on Peakbagger

Volcanoes of Atacama Region
Mountains of Argentina
Mountains of Chile
Volcanoes of Catamarca Province
Polygenetic volcanoes
Argentina–Chile border
International mountains of South America
Six-thousanders of the Andes
Mountains of Atacama Region
Mountains of Catamarca Province
Pleistocene stratovolcanoes